The Jahrhunderthalle (Centennial Hall) is a congress centre located in Frankfurt, Germany. The centre comprises an events hall, exhibition hall and conference centre, respectively known as Kuppelsaal, Kasino and Konferenzareal.

Notable past performers include Lana Del Rey, Genesis, Take That, Grateful Dead, Earth Wind and Fire, Frank Sinatra, the Beach Boys, Johnny Cash, the Doors, Jimi Hendrix, Janis Joplin, James Brown, Ray Charles, Kylie Minogue, Barry Manilow, Loona and the Mormon Tabernacle Choir.

References

Concert halls in Germany
Badminton venues
1963 establishments in Germany
Event venues established in 1963
Buildings and structures in Frankfurt
Music venues completed in 1963
Music venues in Germany